Samm Sinclair Baker (born in Paterson, New Jersey, July 29, 1909 – March 5, 1997) was the author/co-author of many how-to and self-help books, most notably The Complete Scarsdale Medical Diet which he co-authored with Dr. Herman Tarnower.

He also co-authored four books with Dr. Irwin Maxwell Stillman, including The Doctor's Quick Weight Loss Diet. Baker obtained a bachelor’s degree in economics from the University of Pennsylvania.

He was one of the original founders of Stern's Nurseries, developers of Miracle-Gro, and authored several books on gardening.

Baker died in New York in 1997.

Selected publications

Miracle Gardening (1958)
Miracle Gardening Encyclopedia (1961)
The Doctor’s Quick Weight Loss Diet (with Irwin Stillman, 1967)
The Doctor’s Quick Inches-Off Diet  (with Irwin Stillman, 1969)
The Doctor’s Quick Teen-Age Diet (with Irwin Stillman, 1971)
Dr. Stillman’s 14-Day Shape-Up Program (with Irwin Stillman, 1974)
The Complete Scarsdale Medical Diet (with Herman Tarnower, 1978)
Delicious Quick-Trim Diet (1985)

References

External links
Samm S. Baker official web page maintained by his estate

1909 births
1997 deaths
American health and wellness writers
American self-help writers
Diet food advocates
Writers from Paterson, New Jersey
20th-century American non-fiction writers